Tuberculobasis williamsoni is a species of damselfly in the family Coenagrionidae first identified in Colombia and Venezuela.

References

Further reading
von Ellenrieder, Natalia. "Databasing dragonflies: state of knowledge in the Neotropical region." Agrion 13.2 (2009): 58-72.
De Prins, Willy, et al. "illustrated and annotated key to the Zygoptera."Tijdschrift voor Entomologie 153 (2010).
de Prins, W. "Book review: JH Kuchlein & LEJ Bot, 2010. Identification keys to the Microlepidoptera of The Netherlands. Determineertabellen voor de Kleine vlinders van Nederland.–KNNV Publishing & Tinea Foundation, hard bound, 416 p., b/w illustrations. Price€ 59.95 (excl. p&p), www. knnvpublishing. nl." Tijdschrift voor Entomologie 153.2 (2010): 212-238.

External links

Coenagrionidae
Insects described in 2009